Merchants of Doubt: How a Handful of Scientists Obscured the Truth on Issues from Tobacco Smoke to Global Warming is a 2010 non-fiction book by American historians of science Naomi Oreskes and Erik M. Conway. It identifies parallels between the global warming controversy and earlier controversies over tobacco smoking, acid rain, DDT, and the hole in the ozone layer. Oreskes and Conway write that in each case "keeping the controversy alive" by spreading doubt and confusion after a scientific consensus had been reached was the basic strategy of those opposing action. In particular, they show that Fred Seitz, Fred Singer, and a few other contrarian scientists joined forces with conservative think tanks and private corporations to challenge the scientific consensus on many contemporary issues.

Some of the book's subjects have been critical of the book, but most reviewers received it favorably. One reviewer said that Merchants of Doubt is exhaustively researched and documented, and may be one of the most important books of 2010. Another reviewer saw the book as his choice for best science book of the year. It was made into a film, Merchants of Doubt, directed by Robert Kenner, released in 2014.

Themes

Oreskes  and Conway write that a handful of politically conservative scientists, with strong ties to particular industries, have "played a disproportionate role in debates about controversial questions". The authors write that this has resulted in "deliberate obfuscation" of the issues which has had an influence on public opinion and policy-making.

The book criticizes the so-called Merchants of Doubt, some predominantly American science key players, above all Bill Nierenberg, Fred Seitz, and Fred Singer. All three are physicists: Singer was a space and satellite researcher, whereas Nierenberg and Seitz worked on the atomic bomb. They have been active on topics like acid rain, tobacco smoking, global warming and pesticides. The book says that these scientists have challenged and diluted the scientific consensus in the various fields, as of the dangers of smoking, the effects of acid rain, the existence of the "ozone hole", and the existence of anthropogenic climate change. Seitz and Singer have been involved with institutions such as The Heritage Foundation, Competitive Enterprise Institute and George C. Marshall Institute in the United States. Funded by corporations and conservative foundations, these organizations have opposed many forms of state intervention or regulation of U.S. citizens. The book lists similar tactics in each case: "discredit the science, disseminate false information, spread confusion, and promote doubt".

The book states that Seitz, Singer, Nierenberg and Robert Jastrow were all fiercely anti-communist and they viewed government regulation as a step towards socialism and communism. The authors argue that, with the collapse of the Soviet Union, they looked for another great threat to free market capitalism and found it in environmentalism. They feared that an over-reaction to environmental problems would lead to heavy-handed government intervention in the marketplace and intrusion into people's lives. Oreskes and Conway state that the longer the delay the worse these problems get, and the more likely it is that governments will need to take the draconian measures that conservatives and market fundamentalists most fear. They say that Seitz, Singer, Nierenberg and Jastrow denied the scientific evidence, contributed to a strategy of delay, and thereby helped to bring about the situation they most dreaded. The authors have a strong doubt about the ability of the media to differentiate between false truth and the actual science in question; however, they stop short of endorsing censorship in the name of science. The journalistic norm of balanced reporting has helped, according to the authors, to amplify the misleading messages of the contrarians. Oreskes and Conway state: "small numbers of people can have large, negative impacts, especially if they are organised, determined and have access to power".

The main conclusion of the book is that there would have been more progress in policy making if not for the influence of the contrarian "experts", who tried for ideological reasons to undermine trust in the science base for regulation. Similar conclusions were already drawn, among others on Frederick Seitz and William Nierenberg in the book Requiem for a Species: Why We Resist the Truth about Climate Change (2010) by Australian academic Clive Hamilton.

Reception
Most reviewers received Merchants of Doubt enthusiastically.

Philip Kitcher in Science says that Naomi Oreskes and Erik Conway are "two outstanding historians". He calls Merchants of Doubt a "fascinating and important study". Kitcher says that the apparently harsh claims against Nierenberg, Seitz, and Singer are "justified through a powerful dissection of the ways in which prominent climate scientists, such as Roger Revelle and Ben Santer, were exploited or viciously attacked in the press".

In The Christian Science Monitor, Will Buchanan says that Merchants of Doubt is exhaustively researched and documented, and may be one of the most important books of 2010. Oreskes and Conway are seen to demonstrate that the doubt merchants are not "objective scientists" as the term is popularly understood. Instead, they are "science-speaking mercenaries" hired by corporations to process numbers to prove that the corporations' products are safe and useful. Buchanan says they are salesmen, not scientists.

Bud Ward published a review of the book in The Yale Forum on Climate and the Media. He wrote that Oreskes and Conway use a combination of thorough scholarly research combined with writing reminiscent of the best investigative journalism, to "unravel deep common links to past environmental and public health controversies". In terms of climate science, the authors' leave "little doubt about their disdain for what they regard as the misuse and abuse of science by a small cabal of scientists they see as largely lacking in requisite climate science expertise".

Phil England writes in The Ecologist that the strength of the book is the rigour of the research and the detailed focus on key incidents. He said, however, that the climate change chapter is only 50 pages long, and recommends several other books for readers who want to get a broader picture of this aspect: Jim Hoggan's Climate Cover-Up, George Monbiot's Heat: How to Stop the Planet Burning and Ross Gelbspan's The Heat is On and Boiling Point. England also said that there is little coverage about the millions of dollars which Exxon Mobil has put into funding groups actively involved in promoting climate change denial and doubt.

A review in The Economist calls this a powerful book which articulates the politics involved and the degree to which scientists have sometimes manufactured and exaggerated environmental uncertainties, but opines that the authors fail to fully explain how environmental action has still often proved possible despite countervailing factors.

Robert N. Proctor, who coined the term "agnotology" to describe the study of culturally induced ignorance or doubt, wrote in American Scientist that Merchants of Doubt is a detailed and artfully written book. He set it in the context of other books which cover the "history of manufactured ignorance": David Michaels's Doubt is their Product (2008), Chris Mooney's The Republican War on Science (2009), David Rosner and Gerald Markowitz's Deceit and Denial (2002), and his own book Cancer Wars (1995).

Robin McKie in The Guardian states that Oreskes and Conway deserve considerable praise for exposing the influence of a small group of Cold War ideologues. Their tactic of spreading doubt has confused the public about a series of key scientific issues such as global warming, even though scientists have actually become more certain about their research results. McKie says that Merchants of Doubt includes detailed notes on all sources used, is carefully paced, and is "my runaway contender for best science book of the year".

Sociologist Reiner Grundmann's review in BioSocieties journal, acknowledges that the book is well researched and factually based, but criticizes the book as being written in a black and white manner whereas historians should write a more nuanced description. The book depicts special interests and contrarians misleading the public as being mainly responsible for stopping action on policy. He says this shows a lack of basic understanding of the political process and the mechanisms of knowledge policy, because the authors assume that public policy would follow on from an understanding of the science. While the book provides "all the [formal] hallmarks of science", Grundmann sees it less as a scholarly work than a passionate attack and overall as a problematic book.

Authors

Naomi Oreskes is Professor of History and Science Studies at Harvard University. She has degrees in geological science and a Ph.D. in Geological Research and the History of Science. Her work came to public attention in 2004 with the publication of "The Scientific Consensus on Climate Change," in Science, in which she wrote that there was no significant disagreement in the scientific community about the reality of global warming from human causes. Erik M. Conway is the historian at NASA's Jet Propulsion Laboratory at the California Institute of Technology in Pasadena.

See also
 Climate change controversy
 Climate change policy of the United States
 Fear, uncertainty and doubt
 Greenhouse Mafia
 Health effects of tobacco
 List of books about the politics of science
 Scientific consensus on climate change
 Manufactured controversy
 Media coverage of climate change
 Scientific consensus
 Tobacco control movement
Tobacco industry playbook
 Tobacco politics

Other books on the same theme 
 Triumph of Doubt (2020) by David Michaels
 Climate Change Denial: Heads in the Sand (2011) by Haydn Washington and John Cook
 Climate Cover-Up: The Crusade to Deny Global Warming (2009) by James Hoggan and Richard Littlemore
 Doubt Is Their Product: How Industry's Assault on Science Threatens Your Health (2008) by David Michaels

References

External links
 
 Merchants of Doubt, Public Lecture (2010), University of NSW, The Science Show, ABC Radio National, January 8, 2011.

2010 non-fiction books
2010 in the environment
21st-century history books
History books about science
History books about politics
Climate change books
+Merch
Environmental non-fiction books
Books about the politics of science
Books about media manipulation
Non-fiction books adapted into films
Professional ethics
Doubt
Collaborative non-fiction books
Books about disinformation